The Ministry of Women Empowerment and Child Protection (MoWECP) (Indonesian: Kementerian Pemberdayaan Perempuan Dan Perlindungan Anak abbreviated kemenpppa) of the Republic of Indonesia, formerly the Ministry of Women's Empowerment of the Republic of Indonesia is a government ministry responsible for the rights and welfare of women and children of Indonesia. The minister is currently I Gusti Ayu Bintang Darmawati since 23 October 2019.

History 
The Ministry of Women Empowerment and Child Protection (MoWECP) was founded in 1978. It was initially called the Ministry of Women. Its first name change was to Ministry of Women's Affairs in 1998. In 1999, its name was changed again to Ministry of Women's Empowerment. In 2009, the name was finally changed to what it is called today, Ministry of Women Empowerment and Child Protection.

Ministers

References

External links

Women
Indonesia
Children, young people and families ministries
Women in Indonesia
Women's rights in Indonesia